Márcio de Souza Jotha (born 29 January 1979 in Rio de Janeiro), known as Têti, is a Brazilian former football midfielder, who played for a number of clubs in Portugal and Brazil.

Honours 
 Cabofriense
 Campeonato Carioca Série B: 1998

 Santa Cruz
 Campeonato Pernambucano: 2011

References

External links
 CBF

1979 births
Living people
Footballers from Rio de Janeiro (city)
Brazilian footballers
Association football midfielders
Campeonato Brasileiro Série A players
Campeonato Brasileiro Série B players
Campeonato Brasileiro Série C players
Campeonato Brasileiro Série D players
Associação Desportiva Cabofriense players
Friburguense Atlético Clube players
Botafogo de Futebol e Regatas players
CR Vasco da Gama players
Paysandu Sport Club players
Ituano FC players
Associação Atlética Caldense players
Associação Atlética Coruripe players
C.F. Estrela da Amadora players
Expatriate footballers in Portugal
Primeira Liga players
Boavista Sport Club players
America Football Club (RJ) players
Criciúma Esporte Clube players
Santa Cruz Futebol Clube players
Sociedade Esportiva e Recreativa Caxias do Sul players
Grêmio Esportivo Brasil players